Avila College is a Roman Catholic day school for girls which is located in the Melbourne suburb of Mount Waverley. The school was established in 1965 by the Presentation Sisters who accepted an invitation from the parishes in the Waverley area to establish a Catholic Girls' College. The school identifies Saint Teresa of Avila as its patron saint, from whom the Latin motto 'Filiae Ecclesiae' (Daughters of the Church) is derived.

History
Avila College commenced in 1965 in temporary classrooms on the grounds of St Leonard's Catholic Primary School, Glen Waverley. The college was established by the parishes of Mount Waverley, Glen Waverley, Syndal, Mulgrave and Jordanville who invited the Presentation Sisters to administer a Catholic college to provide for families in the area.

From an initial enrolment of 110 girls in Forms 1 and 2 – or years 7 and 8 – the college has grown to become one of the larger Catholic secondary schools for girls in the state with an enrolment of about 1100 students, and 150 staff.

Avila moved to its current location in Charles Street, Mount Waverley, in 1966.

Principals
Sister Patricia Carroll was the founding principal of the college.

College principals:
 Sr. Patricia Carroll dec. (1965–1970)
 Sr. Raymonde Taylor (1971–1973)
 Sr. Josepha Dunlop (1974–1979)
 Patricia Ryan (1980–1986)
 Maureen Thompson (1987–1995)
 Filomena Salvatore dec. (1995–2005)
 Liz Gleeson (2006–2010)
 Louise Gunther (2011–2016)
 Michelle Cotter (2017–present)

Extra-curricular activities

The college offers extra-curricular programs which aim to develop lifelong skills and leadership qualities, as well as to connect with other students and contribute towards the overall College and wider communities. The choices include social justice, reconciliation and conservation groups, music ensembles, a book club, public speaking and debating, and immersion trips to the Santa Teresa community in Central Australia and overseas. 

Avila has a maths club that is managed by a group of students. It aims to nurture and hone their mathematical and logistics skills and offer an insight about how society is going to be post-high school, and is considered by some to truly be one of the most innovative and highly-recommended groups in Avila College, courtesy of the ingenuity of the group of students who run it.

The school also has a brother school, Mazenod College, with which they collaborate on events. This means that the girls also have the opportunity to work and interact with boys of the same age.

Notable Alumnae 
Shae Brown – Netballer
Jill Hennessy – Politician
Michelle Andrews – Co-host of Shameless
Jess Perkins – Co-host of Do Go On and Triple J presenter

See also 
 List of schools in Victoria, Australia
 Victorian Certificate of Education

References

External links
Avila College website

Girls' schools in Victoria (Australia)
Catholic secondary schools in Melbourne
Presentation Sisters schools
Educational institutions established in 1965
1965 establishments in Australia
Alliance of Girls' Schools Australasia
Buildings and structures in the City of Monash